Epichnopterix montana is a moth of the Psychidae family. It is found in Austria, Switzerland and Italy.

References

Moths described in 1900
Psychidae